Prince Idar (Circassian: Айдар) was a Circassian ruler of the Caucasus. He was the son of Prince Inarmaz, and the grandson of Prince Tabula. Prince Inarmaz himself was the eldest of the three grandsons of Prince Inal. His rule spanned over the period of 1525 to 1540.

Reign
Prince Inal had established a strong empire in the fifteenth century uniting all Circassians, and Abkhazians. However, after his death Kabarda was riven into rival principalities. Civil war ensued and Prince Idar emerged as the sole potentiate. During his reign, just like his predecessor, the Kabrdian Circassians dominated the North Caucasus in the late fifteenth century and early sixteenth century. They established diplomatic contacts with the Ottoman Empire, and the Russians.

In the late 1520s the Christian Kabardians, mounted a campaign against the Muslim Crimean Tatars. The Kabardians used their fleet of ships to transport the cavalry and the two-wheeled war chariots across the sea to the Crimean Peninsula. The Kabardians attacked Bakhchisarai, the capital of the Crimean Khanate at the time, located in the southwest of the Peninsula, and were victorious, bringing back great spoil, including 100 chariots packed full with cloth, a precious commodity at the time.

Family
He had four sons, Prince Temryuk, Prince Bita, Prince Zhelegot, and Prince Kanbulat. Temryuk's daughter Altynchach married Bekbulat, a Chinggisid, and khan of Astrakhan Khanate. A third daughter, Mahidevran Sultan, later the consort of Suleiman, the magnificent .

See also
Kabardians

References

External links
 

 

Circassian nobility
Circassians